

Africa

President – Abdelaziz Bouteflika, President of Algeria (1999–2019)
Prime Minister – Ahmed Ouyahia, Prime Minister of Algeria (2008–2012)

President – José Eduardo dos Santos, President of Angola (1979–2017)
Prime Minister – Paulo Kassoma, Prime Minister of Angola (2008–2010)

President – Thomas Boni Yayi, President of Benin (2006–2016)

President – Ian Khama, President of Botswana (2008–2018)

President – Blaise Compaoré, President of Burkina Faso (1987–2014)
Prime Minister – Tertius Zongo, Prime Minister of Burkina Faso (2007–2011)

President – Pierre Nkurunziza, President of Burundi (2005–2020)

President – Paul Biya, President of Cameroon (1982–present)
Prime Minister – Philémon Yang, Prime Minister of Cameroon (2009–2019)

President – Pedro Pires, President of Cape Verde (2001–2011)
Prime Minister – José Maria Neves, Prime Minister of Cape Verde (2001–2016)

President – François Bozizé, President of the Central African Republic (2003–2013)
Prime Minister – Faustin-Archange Touadéra, Prime Minister of the Central African Republic (2008–2013)

President – Idriss Déby, President of Chad (1990–2021)
Prime Minister –
Youssouf Saleh Abbas, Prime Minister of Chad (2008–2010)
Emmanuel Nadingar, Prime Minister of Chad (2010–2013)

President – Ahmed Abdallah Mohamed Sambi, President of the Comoros (2006–2011)

President – Denis Sassou Nguesso, President of the Republic of the Congo (1997–present)

President – Joseph Kabila, President of the Democratic Republic of the Congo (2001–2019)
Prime Minister – Adolphe Muzito, Prime Minister of the Democratic Republic of the Congo (2008–2012)

President – Ismaïl Omar Guelleh, President of Djibouti (1999–present)
Prime Minister – Dileita Mohamed Dileita, Prime Minister of Djibouti (2001–2013)

President – Hosni Mubarak, President of Egypt (1981–2011)
Prime Minister – Ahmed Nazif, Prime Minister of Egypt (2004–2011)

President – Teodoro Obiang Nguema Mbasogo, President of Equatorial Guinea (1979–present)
Prime Minister – Ignacio Milam Tang, Prime Minister of Equatorial Guinea (2008–2012)

President – Isaias Afwerki, President of Eritrea (1991–present)

President – Girma Wolde-Giorgis, President of Ethiopia (2001–2013)
Prime Minister – Meles Zenawi, Prime Minister of Ethiopia (1995–2012)

President – Ali Bongo Ondimba, President of Gabon (2009–present)
Prime Minister – Paul Biyoghé Mba, Prime Minister of Gabon (2009–2012)

President – Yahya Jammeh, President of the Gambia (1994–2017)

President – John Atta Mills, President of Ghana (2009–2012)

President –
Sékouba Konaté, Acting President of Guinea (2009–2010)
Alpha Condé, President of Guinea (2010–2021)
Prime Minister –
Kabiné Komara, Prime Minister of Guinea (2008–2010)
Jean-Marie Doré, Prime Minister of Guinea (2010)
Mohamed Said Fofana, Prime Minister of Guinea (2010–2015)

President – Malam Bacai Sanhá, President of Guinea-Bissau (2009–2012)
Prime Minister – Carlos Gomes Júnior, Prime Minister of Guinea-Bissau (2009–2012)

President –
Laurent Gbagbo, President of the Ivory Coast (2000–2011; claimant, 2010–2011)
Alassane Ouattara, President of the Ivory Coast (2010–present)
Prime Minister –
Guillaume Soro, Prime Minister of the Ivory Coast (2007–2012)
Gilbert Aké, Prime Minister of the Ivory Coast (claimant, 2010–2011)

President – Mwai Kibaki, President of Kenya (2002–2013)
Prime Minister – Raila Odinga, Prime Minister of Kenya (2008–2013)

Monarch – Letsie III, King of Lesotho (1996–present)
Prime Minister – Pakalitha Mosisili, Prime Minister of Lesotho (1998–2012)

President – Ellen Johnson Sirleaf, President of Liberia (2006–2018)

De facto Head of State – Muammar Gaddafi, Guide of the Revolution of Libya (1969–2011)
De jure Head of State –
Imbarek Shamekh, General Secretary of the General People's Congress of Libya (2009–2010)
Mohamed Abu al-Qasim al-Zwai, General Secretary of the General People's Congress of Libya (2010–2011)
Prime Minister – Baghdadi Mahmudi, General Secretary of the General People's Committee of Libya (2006–2011)

the Third Republic was superseded on 11 December
Head of State – Andry Rajoelina, President of the High Transitional Authority of Madagascar (2009–2014)
Prime Minister – Albert Camille Vital, Prime Minister of Madagascar (2009–2011)
 
President – Bingu wa Mutharika, President of Malawi (2004–2012)

President – Amadou Toumani Touré, President of Mali (2002–2012)
Prime Minister – Modibo Sidibé, Prime Minister of Mali (2007–2011)

President – Mohamed Ould Abdel Aziz, President of Mauritania (2009–2019)
Prime Minister – Moulaye Ould Mohamed Laghdaf, Prime Minister of Mauritania (2008–2014)

President – Sir Anerood Jugnauth, President of Mauritius (2003–2012)
Prime Minister – Navin Ramgoolam, Prime Minister of Mauritius (2005–2014)
  (overseas collectivity of France)
Prefect – Hubert Derache, Prefect of Mayotte (2009–2011)
Head of Government – Ahmed Attoumani Douchina, President of the General Council of Mayotte (2008–2011)

Monarch – Mohammed VI, King of Morocco (1999–present)
Prime Minister – Abbas El Fassi, Prime Minister of Morocco (2007–2011)
 (self-declared, partially recognised state)
President – Mohamed Abdelaziz, President of Western Sahara (1976–2016)
Prime Minister – Abdelkader Taleb Omar, Prime Minister of Western Sahara (2003–2018)

President – Armando Guebuza, President of Mozambique (2005–2015)
Prime Minister –
Luísa Diogo, Prime Minister of Mozambique (2004–2010)
Aires Ali, Prime Minister of Mozambique (2010–2012)

President – Hifikepunye Pohamba, President of Namibia (2005–2015)
Prime Minister – Nahas Angula, Prime Minister of Namibia (2005–2012)

Head of State –
Mamadou Tandja, President of Niger (1999–2010)
Salou Djibo, President of the Supreme Council for the Restoration of Democracy of Niger (2010–2011)
Prime Minister –
Ali Badjo Gamatié, Prime Minister of Niger (2009–2010)
Mahamadou Danda, Prime Minister of Niger (2010–2011)

President –
Umaru Musa Yar'Adua, President of Nigeria (2007–2010)
Goodluck Jonathan, President of Nigeria (2010–2015)

President – Paul Kagame, President of Rwanda (2000–present)
Prime Minister – Bernard Makuza, Prime Minister of Rwanda (2000–2011)
 (Overseas Territory of the United Kingdom)
Governor – Andrew Gurr, Governor of Saint Helena (2007–2011)

President – Fradique de Menezes, President of São Tomé and Príncipe (2003–2011)
Prime Minister –
Joaquim Rafael Branco, Prime Minister of São Tomé and Príncipe (2008–2010)
Patrice Trovoada, Prime Minister of São Tomé and Príncipe (2010–2012)

President – Abdoulaye Wade, President of Senegal (2000–2012)
Prime Minister – Souleymane Ndéné Ndiaye, Prime Minister of Senegal (2009–2012)

President – James Michel, President of Seychelles (2004–2016)

President – Ernest Bai Koroma, President of Sierra Leone (2007–2018)

President – Sharif Sheikh Ahmed, President of Somalia (2009–2012)
Prime Minister –
Omar Abdirashid Ali Sharmarke, Prime Minister of Somalia (2009–2010)
Abdiwahid Elmi Gonjeh, Acting Prime Minister of Somalia (2010)
Mohamed Abdullahi Mohamed, Prime Minister of Somalia (2010–2011)
 (unrecognised, secessionist state)
President –
Dahir Riyale Kahin, President of Somaliland (2002–2010)
Ahmed Mohamed Mohamoud, President of Somaliland (2010–2017)
 (self-declared autonomous state)
President – Abdirahman Farole, President of Puntland (2009–2014)

President – Jacob Zuma, President of South Africa (2009–2018)

President – Omar al-Bashir, President of Sudan (1989–2019)

Monarch – Mswati III, King of Swaziland (1986–present)
Prime Minister – Barnabas Sibusiso Dlamini, Prime Minister of Swaziland (2008–2018)

President – Jakaya Kikwete, President of Tanzania (2005–2015)
Prime Minister – Mizengo Pinda, Prime Minister of Tanzania (2008–2015)

President – Faure Gnassingbé, President of Togo (2005–present)
Prime Minister – Gilbert Houngbo, Prime Minister of Togo (2008–2012)

President – Zine El Abidine Ben Ali, President of Tunisia (1987–2011)
Prime Minister – Mohamed Ghannouchi, Prime Minister of Tunisia (1999–2011)

President – Yoweri Museveni, President of Uganda (1986–present)
Prime Minister – Apolo Nsibambi, Prime Minister of Uganda (1999–2011)

President – Rupiah Banda, President of Zambia (2008–2011)

President – Robert Mugabe, President of Zimbabwe (1987–2017)
Prime Minister – Morgan Tsvangirai, Prime Minister of Zimbabwe (2009–2013)

Asia

President – Hamid Karzai, President of Afghanistan (2002–2014)

Monarch – Sheikh Hamad bin Isa Al Khalifa, King of Bahrain (1999–present)
Prime Minister – Prince Khalifa bin Salman Al Khalifa, Prime Minister of Bahrain (1970–2020)

President – Zillur Rahman, President of Bangladesh (2009–2013)
Prime Minister – Sheikh Hasina, Prime Minister of Bangladesh (2009–present)

Monarch – Jigme Khesar Namgyel Wangchuck, King of Bhutan (2006–present)
Prime Minister – Jigme Thinley, Prime Minister of Bhutan (2008–2013)

Monarch – Hassanal Bolkiah, Sultan of Brunei (1967–present)
Prime Minister – Hassanal Bolkiah, Prime Minister of Brunei (1984–present)

Monarch – Norodom Sihamoni, King of Cambodia (2004–present)
Prime Minister – Hun Sen, Prime Minister of Cambodia (1985–present)

Communist Party Leader – Hu Jintao, General Secretary of the Chinese Communist Party (2002–2012)
President – Hu Jintao, President of China (2003–2013)
Premier – Wen Jiabao, Premier of the State Council of China (2003–2013)

President – José Ramos-Horta, President of East Timor (2007–2012)
Prime Minister – Xanana Gusmão, Prime Minister of East Timor (2007–2015)

President – Pratibha Patil, President of India (2007–2012)
Prime Minister – Manmohan Singh, Prime Minister of India (2004–2014)

President – Susilo Bambang Yudhoyono, President of Indonesia (2004–2014)

Supreme Leader – Ayatollah Ali Khamenei, Supreme Leader of Iran (1989–present)
President – Mahmoud Ahmadinejad, President of Iran (2005–2013)

Head of State –
Presidency Council of Iraq
Members – Jalal Talabani (2006–2010; President of Iraq, 2006–2010), and Adil Abdul-Mahdi and Tariq al-Hashimi (2006–2010)
Jalal Talabani, President of Iraq (2010–2014)
Prime Minister – Nouri al-Maliki, Prime Minister of Iraq (2006–2014)

President – Shimon Peres, President of Israel (2007–2014)
Prime Minister – Benjamin Netanyahu, Prime Minister of Israel (2009–2021)
 (non-state administrative authority)
President – Mahmoud Abbas, President of the Palestinian National Authority (in the West Bank) (2005–present)
Prime Minister – Salam Fayyad, Prime Minister of the Palestinian National Authority (in the West Bank) (2007–2013)
  Gaza Strip (rebelling against the Palestinian National Authority, in the West Bank)
President – Aziz Duwaik, Acting President of the Palestinian National Authority (in the Gaza Strip) (2009–2014)
Prime Minister – Ismail Haniyeh, Prime Minister of the Palestinian National Authority (in the Gaza Strip) (2007–2014)

Monarch – Akihito, Emperor of Japan (1989–2019)
Prime Minister –
Yukio Hatoyama, Prime Minister of Japan (2009–2010)
Naoto Kan, Prime Minister of Japan (2010–2011)

Monarch – Abdullah II, King of Jordan (1999–present)
Prime Minister – Samir Rifai, Prime Minister of Jordan (2009–2011)

President – Nursultan Nazarbayev, President of Kazakhstan (1990–2019)
Prime Minister – Karim Massimov, Prime Minister of Kazakhstan (2007–2012)

Communist Party Leader – Kim Jong-il, General Secretary of the Workers' Party of Korea (1997–2011)
De facto Head of State – Kim Jong-il, Chairman of the National Defence Commission of North Korea (1993–2011)
De jure Head of State – Kim Yong-nam, Chairman of the Presidium of the Supreme People's Assembly of North Korea (1998–2019)
Premier –
Kim Yong-il, Premier of the Cabinet of North Korea (2007–2010)
Choe Yong-rim, Premier of the Cabinet of North Korea (2010–2013)

President – Lee Myung-bak, President of South Korea (2008–2013)
Prime Minister –
Chung Un-chan, Prime Minister of South Korea (2009–2010)
Yoon Jeung-hyun, Acting Prime Minister of South Korea (2010)
Kim Hwang-sik, Prime Minister of South Korea (2010–2013)

Monarch – Sheikh Sabah Al-Ahmad Al-Jaber Al-Sabah, Emir of Kuwait (2006–2020)
Prime Minister – Sheikh Nasser Al-Sabah, Prime Minister of Kuwait (2006–2011)

President –
Kurmanbek Bakiyev, President of Kyrgyzstan (2005–2010)
Roza Otunbayeva, President of Kyrgyzstan (2010–2011)
Prime Minister –
Daniar Usenov, Prime Minister of Kyrgyzstan (2009–2010)
Roza Otunbayeva, Acting Prime Minister of Kyrgyzstan (2010)
Almazbek Atambayev, Prime Minister of Kyrgyzstan (2010–2011)

Communist Party Leader – Choummaly Sayasone, General Secretary of the Lao People's Revolutionary Party (2006–2016)
President – Choummaly Sayasone, President of Laos (2006–2016)
Prime Minister –
Bouasone Bouphavanh, Chairman of the Council of Ministers of Laos (2006–2010)
Thongsing Thammavong, Chairman of the Council of Ministers of Laos (2010–2016)

President – Michel Suleiman, President of Lebanon (2008–2014)
Prime Minister – Saad Hariri, President of the Council of Ministers of Lebanon (2009–2011)

Monarch – Tuanku Mizan Zainal Abidin, Yang di-Pertuan Agong of Malaysia (2006–2011)
Prime Minister – Najib Razak, Prime Minister of Malaysia (2009–2018)

President – Mohamed Nasheed, President of the Maldives (2008–2012)

President – Tsakhiagiin Elbegdorj, President of Mongolia (2009–2017)
Prime Minister – Sükhbaataryn Batbold, Prime Minister of Mongolia (2009–2012)
 
Head of State – Than Shwe, Chairman of the State Peace and Development Council of Myanmar (1992–2011)
Prime Minister – Thein Sein, Prime Minister of Myanmar (2007–2011)

President – Ram Baran Yadav, President of Nepal (2008–2015)
Prime Minister – Madhav Kumar Nepal, Prime Minister of Nepal (2009–2011)

Monarch – Qaboos bin Said al Said, Sultan of Oman (1970–present)
Prime Minister – Qaboos bin Said al Said, Prime Minister of Oman (1972–present)

President – Asif Ali Zardari, President of Pakistan (2008–2013)
Prime Minister – Yousaf Raza Gillani, Prime Minister of Pakistan (2008–2012)

President –
Gloria Macapagal Arroyo, President of the Philippines (2001–2010)
Benigno Aquino, President of the Philippines (2010–2016)

Monarch – Sheikh Hamad bin Khalifa Al Thani, Emir of Qatar (1995–2013)
Prime Minister – Sheikh Hamad bin Jassim bin Jaber Al Thani, Prime Minister of Qatar (2007–2013)

Monarch – Abdullah, King of Saudi Arabia (2005–2015)
Prime Minister – Abdullah, Prime Minister of Saudi Arabia (2005–2015)

President – S. R. Nathan, President of Singapore (1999–2011)
Prime Minister – Lee Hsien Loong, Prime Minister of Singapore (2004–present)

President – Mahinda Rajapaksa, President of Sri Lanka (2005–2015)
Prime Minister –
Ratnasiri Wickremanayake, Prime Minister of Sri Lanka (2005–2010)
D. M. Jayaratne, Prime Minister of Sri Lanka (2010–2015)

President – Bashar al-Assad, President of Syria (2000–present)
Prime Minister – Muhammad Naji al-Otari, Prime Minister of Syria (2003–2011)

President – Ma Ying-jeou, President of Taiwan (2008–2016)
Premier – Wu Den-yih, President of the Executive Yuan of Taiwan (2009–2012)

President – Emomali Rahmon, President of Tajikistan (1992–present)
Prime Minister – Oqil Oqilov, Prime Minister of Tajikistan (1999–2013)

Monarch – Bhumibol Adulyadej, King of Thailand (1946–2016)
Prime Minister – Abhisit Vejjajiva, Prime Minister of Thailand (2008–2011)

President – Abdullah Gül, President of Turkey (2007–2014)
Prime Minister – Recep Tayyip Erdoğan, Prime Minister of Turkey (2003–2014)

President – Gurbanguly Berdimuhamedow, President of Turkmenistan (2006–2022)

President – Sheikh Khalifa bin Zayed Al Nahyan, President of the United Arab Emirates (2004–present)
Prime Minister – Sheikh Mohammed bin Rashid Al Maktoum, Prime Minister of the United Arab Emirates (2006–present)

President – Islam Karimov, President of Uzbekistan (1990–2016)
Prime Minister – Shavkat Mirziyoyev, Prime Minister of Uzbekistan (2003–2016)

Communist Party Leader – Nông Đức Mạnh, General Secretary of the Communist Party of Vietnam (2001–2011)
President – Nguyễn Minh Triết, President of Vietnam (2006–2011)
Prime Minister – Nguyễn Tấn Dũng, Prime Minister of Vietnam (2006–2016)

President – Ali Abdullah Saleh, President of Yemen (1978–2012)
Prime Minister – Ali Muhammad Mujawar, Prime Minister of Yemen (2007–2011)

Europe

President – Bamir Topi, President of Albania (2007–2012)
Prime Minister – Sali Berisha, Prime Minister of Albania (2005–2013)

Monarchs –
French Co-Prince – Nicolas Sarkozy, French Co-prince of Andorra (2007–2012)
Co-Prince's Representative – Christian Frémont (2008–2012)
Episcopal Co-Prince – Archbishop Joan Enric Vives Sicília, Episcopal Co-prince of Andorra (2003–present)
Co-Prince's Representative – Nemesi Marqués Oste (1993–2012)
Prime Minister – Jaume Bartumeu, Head of Government of Andorra (2009–2011)

President – Serzh Sargsyan, President of Armenia (2008–2018)
Prime Minister – Tigran Sargsyan, Prime Minister of Armenia (2008–2014)

President – Heinz Fischer, Federal President of Austria (2004–2016)
Chancellor – Werner Faymann, Federal Chancellor of Austria (2008–2016)

President – Ilham Aliyev, President of Azerbaijan (2003–present)
Prime Minister – Artur Rasizade, Prime Minister of Azerbaijan (2003–2018)
 (unrecognised, secessionist state)
President – Bako Sahakyan, President of Nagorno-Karabakh (2007–2020)
Prime Minister – Arayik Harutyunyan, Prime Minister of Nagorno-Karabakh (2007–2017)

President – Alexander Lukashenko, President of Belarus (1994–present)
Prime Minister –
Sergei Sidorsky, Prime Minister of Belarus (2003–2010)
Mikhail Myasnikovich, Prime Minister of Belarus (2010–2014)

Monarch – Albert II, King of the Belgians (1993–2013)
Prime Minister – Yves Leterme, Prime Minister of Belgium (2009–2011)

Head of State – Presidency of Bosnia and Herzegovina
Serb Member – Nebojša Radmanović (2006–2014; Chairman of the Presidency of Bosnia and Herzegovina, 2010–2011)
Bosniak Member –
Haris Silajdžić (2006–2010; Chairman of the Presidency of Bosnia and Herzegovina, 2010)
Bakir Izetbegović (2010–2018)
Croat Member – Željko Komšić (2006–2014; Chairman of the Presidency of Bosnia and Herzegovina, 2009–2010)
Prime Minister – Nikola Špirić, Chairman of the Council of Ministers of Bosnia and Herzegovina (2007–2012)
High Representative – Valentin Inzko, High Representative for Bosnia and Herzegovina (2009–2021)

President – Georgi Parvanov, President of Bulgaria (2002–2012)
Prime Minister – Boyko Borisov, Prime Minister of Bulgaria (2009–2013)

President –
Stjepan Mesić, President of Croatia (2000–2010)
Ivo Josipović, President of Croatia (2010–2015)
Prime Minister – Jadranka Kosor, Prime Minister of Croatia (2009–2011)

President – Demetris Christofias, President of Cyprus (2008–2013)
 (unrecognised, secessionist state)
President –
Mehmet Ali Talat, President of Northern Cyprus (2005–2010)
Derviş Eroğlu, President of Northern Cyprus (2010–2015)
Prime Minister –
Derviş Eroğlu, Prime Minister of Northern Cyprus (2009–2010)
Hüseyin Özgürgün, Acting Prime Minister of Northern Cyprus (2010)
İrsen Küçük, Prime Minister of Northern Cyprus (2010–2013)

President – Václav Klaus, President of the Czech Republic (2003–2013)
Prime Minister –
Jan Fischer, Prime Minister of the Czech Republic (2009–2010)
Petr Nečas, Prime Minister of the Czech Republic (2010–2013)

Monarch – Margrethe II, Queen of Denmark (1972–present)
Prime Minister – Lars Løkke Rasmussen, Prime Minister of Denmark (2009–2011)

President – Toomas Hendrik Ilves, President of Estonia (2006–2016)
Prime Minister – Andrus Ansip, Prime Minister of Estonia (2005–2014)

President – Tarja Halonen, President of Finland (2000–2012)
Prime Minister –
Matti Vanhanen, Prime Minister of Finland (2003–2010)
Mari Kiviniemi, Prime Minister of Finland (2010–2011)

President – Nicolas Sarkozy, President of France (2007–2012)
Prime Minister – François Fillon, Prime Minister of France (2007–2012)

President – Mikheil Saakashvili, President of Georgia (2008–2013)
Prime Minister – Nika Gilauri, Prime Minister of Georgia (2009–2012)
 (partially recognised, secessionist state)
President – Sergei Bagapsh, President of Abkhazia (2005–2011)
Prime Minister –
Aleksander Ankvab, Prime Minister of Abkhazia (2005–2010)
Sergei Shamba, Prime Minister of Abkhazia (2010–2011)
 (partially recognised, secessionist state)
President – Eduard Kokoity, President of South Ossetia (2001–2011)
Prime Minister – Vadim Brovtsev, Prime Minister of South Ossetia (2009–2012)

President –
Horst Köhler, Federal President of Germany (2004–2010)
Jens Böhrnsen, Acting Federal President of Germany (2010)
Christian Wulff, Federal President of Germany (2010–2012)
Chancellor – Angela Merkel, Federal Chancellor of Germany (2005–2021)

President – Karolos Papoulias, President of Greece (2005–2015)
Prime Minister – George Papandreou, Prime Minister of Greece (2009–2011)

President –
László Sólyom, President of Hungary (2005–2010)
Pál Schmitt, President of Hungary (2010–2012)
Prime Minister –
Gordon Bajnai, Prime Minister of Hungary (2009–2010)
Viktor Orbán, Prime Minister of Hungary (2010–present)

President – Ólafur Ragnar Grímsson, President of Iceland (1996–2016)
Prime Minister – Jóhanna Sigurðardóttir, Prime Minister of Iceland (2009–2013)

President – Mary McAleese, President of Ireland (1997–2011)
Prime Minister – Brian Cowen, Taoiseach of Ireland (2008–2011)

President – Giorgio Napolitano, President of Italy (2006–2015)
Prime Minister – Silvio Berlusconi, President of the Council of Ministers of Italy (2008–2011)

President – Valdis Zatlers, President of Latvia (2007–2011)
Prime Minister – Valdis Dombrovskis, Prime Minister of Latvia (2009–2014)

Monarch – Hans-Adam II, Prince Regnant of Liechtenstein (1989–present)
Regent – Hereditary Prince Alois, Regent of Liechtenstein (2004–present)
Prime Minister – Klaus Tschütscher, Head of Government of Liechtenstein (2009–2013)

President – Dalia Grybauskaitė, President of Lithuania (2009–2019)
Prime Minister – Andrius Kubilius, Prime Minister of Lithuania (2008–2012)

Monarch – Henri, Grand Duke of Luxembourg (2000–present)
Prime Minister – Jean-Claude Juncker, Prime Minister of Luxembourg (1995–2013)

President – Gjorge Ivanov, President of Macedonia (2009–2019)
Prime Minister – Nikola Gruevski, President of the Government of Macedonia (2006–2016)

President – George Abela, President of Malta (2009–2014)
Prime Minister – Lawrence Gonzi, Prime Minister of Malta (2004–2013)

President –
Mihai Ghimpu, Acting President of Moldova (2009–2010)
Vlad Filat, Acting President of Moldova (2010)
Marian Lupu, Acting President of Moldova (2010–2012)
Prime Minister – Vlad Filat, Prime Minister of Moldova (2009–2013)
 (unrecognised, secessionist state)
President – Igor Smirnov, President of Transnistria (1990–2011)

Monarch – Albert II, Sovereign Prince of Monaco (2005–present)
Prime Minister –
Jean-Paul Proust, Minister of State of Monaco (2005–2010)
Michel Roger, Minister of State of Monaco (2010–2015)

President – Filip Vujanović, President of Montenegro (2003–2018)
Prime Minister –
Milo Đukanović, President of the Government of Montenegro (2008–2010)
Igor Lukšić, President of the Government of Montenegro (2010–2012)

Monarch – Beatrix, Queen of the Netherlands (1980–2013)
 (constituent country)
Prime Minister –
Jan Peter Balkenende, Prime Minister of the Netherlands (2002–2010)
Mark Rutte, Prime Minister of the Netherlands (2010–present)
 (constituent country)
see 
 (constituent country)
see 
 (constituent country)
see 
 (constituent country)
see 

Monarch – Harald V, King of Norway (1991–present)
Prime Minister – Jens Stoltenberg, Prime Minister of Norway (2005–2013)

President –
Lech Kaczyński, President of Poland (2005–2010)
Bronisław Komorowski, Acting President of Poland (2010)
Bogdan Borusewicz, Acting President of Poland (2010)
Grzegorz Schetyna, Acting President of Poland (2010)
Bronisław Komorowski, President of Poland (2010–2015)
Prime Minister – Donald Tusk, Chairman of the Council of Ministers of Poland (2007–2014)

President – Aníbal Cavaco Silva, President of Portugal (2006–2016)
Prime Minister – José Sócrates, Prime Minister of Portugal (2005–2011)

President – Traian Băsescu, President of Romania (2004–2014)
Prime Minister – Emil Boc, Prime Minister of Romania (2008–2012)

President – Dmitry Medvedev, President of Russia (2008–2012)
Prime Minister – Vladimir Putin, Chairman of the Government of Russia (2008–2012)

Captains-Regent –
Francesco Mussoni and Stefano Palmieri, Captains Regent of San Marino (2009–2010)
Marco Conti and Glauco Sansovini, Captains Regent of San Marino (2010)
Giovanni Francesco Ugolini and Andrea Zafferani, Captains Regent of San Marino (2010–2011)
 
President – Boris Tadić, President of Serbia (2004–2012)
Prime Minister – Mirko Cvetković, President of the Government of Serbia (2008–2012)
 (partially recognised, secessionist state; under nominal international administration)
President –
Fatmir Sejdiu, President of Kosovo (2006–2010)
Jakup Krasniqi, Acting President of Kosovo (2010–2011)
Prime Minister – Hashim Thaçi, Prime Minister of Kosovo (2008–2014)
UN Special Representative – Lamberto Zannier, Special Representative of the UN Secretary-General for Kosovo (2008–2011)

President – Ivan Gašparovič, President of Slovakia (2004–2014)
Prime Minister –
Robert Fico, Prime Minister of Slovakia (2006–2010)
Iveta Radičová, Prime Minister of Slovakia (2010–2012)

President – Danilo Türk, President of Slovenia (2007–2012)
Prime Minister – Borut Pahor, Prime Minister of Slovenia (2008–2012)

Monarch – Juan Carlos I, King of Spain (1975–2014)
Prime Minister – José Luis Rodríguez Zapatero, President of the Government of Spain (2004–2011)

Monarch – Carl XVI Gustaf, King of Sweden (1973–present)
Prime Minister – Fredrik Reinfeldt, Prime Minister of Sweden (2006–2014)

Council – Federal Council of Switzerland
Members – Moritz Leuenberger (1995–2010), Micheline Calmy-Rey (2002–2011), Hans-Rudolf Merz (2003–2010), Doris Leuthard (2006–present; President of Switzerland, 2010), Eveline Widmer-Schlumpf (2008–2015), Ueli Maurer (2009–present), Didier Burkhalter (2009–present), Johann Schneider-Ammann (2010–present), and Simonetta Sommaruga (2010–present)

President –
Viktor Yushchenko, President of Ukraine (2005–2010)
Viktor Yanukovych, President of Ukraine (2010–2014)
Prime Minister –
Yulia Tymoshenko, Prime Minister of Ukraine (2007–2010)
Oleksandr Turchynov, Acting Prime Minister of Ukraine (2010)
Mykola Azarov, Prime Minister of Ukraine (2010–2014)

Monarch – Elizabeth II, Queen of the United Kingdom (1952–present)
Prime Minister –
Gordon Brown, Prime Minister of the United Kingdom (2007–2010)
David Cameron, Prime Minister of the United Kingdom (2010–2016)
 (Crown dependency of the United Kingdom)
Lieutenant-Governor – Sir Paul Haddacks, Lieutenant Governor of the Isle of Man (2005–2011)
Chief Minister – Tony Brown, Chief Minister of the Isle of Man (2006–2011)
 (Crown dependency of the United Kingdom)
Lieutenant-Governor – Sir Fabian Malbon, Lieutenant Governor of Guernsey (2005–2011)
Chief Minister – Lyndon Trott, Chief Minister of Guernsey (2008–2012)
 (Crown dependency of the United Kingdom)
Lieutenant-Governor – Andrew Ridgway, Lieutenant Governor of Jersey (2006–2011)
Chief Minister – Terry Le Sueur, Chief Minister of Jersey (2008–2011)
 (Overseas Territory of the United Kingdom)
Governor – Sir Adrian Johns, Governor of Gibraltar (2009–2013)
Chief Minister – Peter Caruana, Chief Minister of Gibraltar (1996–2011)

Monarch – Pope Benedict XVI, Sovereign of Vatican City (2005–2013)
Head of Government – Cardinal Giovanni Lajolo, President of the Governorate of Vatican City (2006–2011)
Holy See (sui generis subject of public international law)
Secretary of State – Cardinal Tarcisio Bertone, Cardinal Secretary of State (2006–2013)

North America
 (Overseas Territory of the United Kingdom)
Governor – Alistair Harrison, Governor of Anguilla (2009–2013)
Chief Minister –
Osbourne Fleming, Chief Minister of Anguilla (2000–2010)
Hubert Hughes, Chief Minister of Anguilla (2010–2015)

Monarch – Elizabeth II, Queen of Antigua and Barbuda (1981–present)
Governor-General – Dame Louise Lake-Tack, Governor-General of Antigua and Barbuda (2007–2014)
Prime Minister – Baldwin Spencer, Prime Minister of Antigua and Barbuda (2004–2014)
 (constituent country of the Kingdom of the Netherlands)
Governor – Fredis Refunjol, Governor of Aruba (2004–2016)
Prime Minister – Mike Eman, Prime Minister of Aruba (2009–present)

Monarch – Elizabeth II, Queen of the Bahamas (1973–present)
Governor-General –
Arthur Dion Hanna, Governor-General of the Bahamas (2006–2010)
Sir Arthur Foulkes, Governor-General of the Bahamas (2010–2014)
Prime Minister – Hubert Ingraham, Prime Minister of the Bahamas (2007–2012)

Monarch – Elizabeth II, Queen of Barbados (1966–2021)
Governor-General – Sir Clifford Husbands, Governor-General of Barbados (1996–2011)
Prime Minister –
David Thompson, Prime Minister of Barbados (2008–2010)
Freundel Stuart, Prime Minister of Barbados (2010–2018)

Monarch – Elizabeth II, Queen of Belize (1981–present)
Governor-General – Sir Colville Young, Governor-General of Belize (1993–2021)
Prime Minister – Dean Barrow, Prime Minister of Belize (2008–2020)
 (Overseas Territory of the United Kingdom)
Governor – Sir Richard Gozney, Governor of Bermuda (2007–2012)
Premier –
Ewart Brown, Premier of Bermuda (2006–2010)
Paula Cox, Premier of Bermuda (2010–2012)
 (Overseas Territory of the United Kingdom)
Governor –
David Pearey, Governor of the British Virgin Islands (2006–2010)
Vivian Inez Archibald, Acting Governor of the British Virgin Islands (2010)
William Boyd McCleary, Governor of the British Virgin Islands (2010–2014)
Premier – Ralph T. O'Neal, Premier of the British Virgin Islands (2007–2011)

Monarch – Elizabeth II, Queen of Canada (1952–present)
Governor-General –
Michaëlle Jean, Governor General of Canada (2005–2010)
David Johnston, Governor General of Canada (2010–2017)
Prime Minister – Stephen Harper, Prime Minister of Canada (2006–2015)
 (Overseas Territory of the United Kingdom)
Governor –
Donovan Ebanks, Acting Governor of the Cayman Islands (2009–2010)
Duncan Taylor, Governor of the Cayman Islands (2010–2013)
Premier – McKeeva Bush, Premier of the Cayman Islands (2009–2012)

President –
Óscar Arias, President of Costa Rica (2006–2010)
Laura Chinchilla, President of Costa Rica (2010–2014)

Communist Party Leader –
 Fidel Castro, First Secretary of the Communist Party of Cuba (1965–2011)
 Raúl Castro, Acting First Secretary of the Communist Party of Cuba (2006–2011)
President – Raúl Castro, President of the Council of State of Cuba (2008–2018)
Prime Minister – Raúl Castro, President of the Council of Ministers of Cuba (2008–2018)
 (constituent country of the Kingdom of the Netherlands)
separately became a constituent country, with the dissolution of the Netherlands Antilles, on 10 October
Governor – Frits Goedgedrag, Governor of Curaçao (2010–2012)
Prime Minister – Gerrit Schotte, Prime Minister of Curaçao (2010–2012)

President – Nicholas Liverpool, President of Dominica (2003–2012)
Prime Minister – Roosevelt Skerrit, Prime Minister of Dominica (2004–present)

President – Leonel Fernández, President of the Dominican Republic (2004–2012)

President – Mauricio Funes, President of El Salvador (2009–2014)

Monarch – Elizabeth II, Queen of Grenada (1974–present)
Governor-General – Sir Carlyle Glean, Governor-General of Grenada (2008–2013)
Prime Minister – Tillman Thomas, Prime Minister of Grenada (2008–2013)

President – Álvaro Colom, President of Guatemala (2008–2012)

President – René Préval, President of Haiti (2006–2011)
Prime Minister – Jean-Max Bellerive, Prime Minister of Haiti (2009–2011)

President –
Roberto Micheletti, President of Honduras (2009–2010)
Porfirio Lobo Sosa, President of Honduras (2010–2014)

Monarch – Elizabeth II, Queen of Jamaica (1962–present)
Governor-General – Sir Patrick Allen, Governor-General of Jamaica (2009–present)
Prime Minister – Bruce Golding, Prime Minister of Jamaica (2007–2011)

President – Felipe Calderón, President of Mexico (2006–2012)
 (Overseas Territory of the United Kingdom)
Governor – Peter Waterworth, Governor of Montserrat (2007–2011)
Chief Minister – Reuben Meade, Chief Minister of Montserrat (2009–2014)
 (constituent country of the Kingdom of the Netherlands)
dissolved into both Curaçao and Sint Maarten on 10 October
Governor – Frits Goedgedrag, Governor of the Netherlands Antilles (2002–2010)
Prime Minister – Emily de Jongh-Elhage, Prime Minister of the Netherlands Antilles (2006–2010)

President – Daniel Ortega, President of Nicaragua (2007–present)

President – Ricardo Martinelli, President of Panama (2009–2014)
  (overseas collectivity of France)
Prefect – Jacques Simonnet, Prefect of Saint Barthélemy (2009–2011)
Head of Government – Bruno Magras, President of the Territorial Council of Saint Barthélemy (2007–present)

Monarch – Elizabeth II, Queen of Saint Kitts and Nevis (1983–present)
Governor-General – Sir Cuthbert Sebastian, Governor-General of Saint Kitts and Nevis (1996–2013)
Prime Minister – Denzil Douglas, Prime Minister of Saint Kitts and Nevis (1995–2015)

Monarch – Elizabeth II, Queen of Saint Lucia (1979–present)
Governor-General – Dame Pearlette Louisy, Governor-General of Saint Lucia (1997–2017)
Prime Minister – Stephenson King, Prime Minister of Saint Lucia (2007–2011)
 (overseas collectivity of France)
Prefect – Jacques Simonnet, Prefect of Saint Martin (2009–2011)
Head of Government – Frantz Gumbs, President of the Territorial Council of Saint Martin (2009–2012)
  (overseas collectivity of France)
Prefect – Jean-Régis Borius, Prefect of Saint Pierre and Miquelon (2009–2011)
Head of Government – Stéphane Artano, President of the Territorial Council of Saint Pierre and Miquelon (2006–2017)

Monarch – Elizabeth II, Queen of Saint Vincent and the Grenadines (1979–present)
Governor-General – Sir Frederick Ballantyne, Governor-General of Saint Vincent and the Grenadines (2002–2019)
Prime Minister – Ralph Gonsalves, Prime Minister of Saint Vincent and the Grenadines (2001–present)
 (constituent country of the Kingdom of the Netherlands)
separately became a constituent country, with the dissolution of the Netherlands Antilles, on 10 October
Governor – Eugene Holiday, Governor of Sint Maarten (2010–present)
Prime Minister – Sarah Wescot-Williams, Prime Minister of Sint Maarten (2010–2014)

President – George Maxwell Richards, President of Trinidad and Tobago (2003–2013)
Prime Minister –
Patrick Manning, Prime Minister of Trinidad and Tobago (2001–2010)
Kamla Persad-Bissessar, Prime Minister of Trinidad and Tobago (2010–2015)
 (Overseas Territory of the United Kingdom)
Governor – Gordon Wetherell, Governor of the Turks and Caicos Islands (2008–2011)

President – Barack Obama, President of the United States (2009–2017)
 (Commonwealth of the United States)
Governor – Luis Fortuño, Governor of Puerto Rico (2009–2013)
 (insular area of the United States)
Governor – John de Jongh, Governor of the United States Virgin Islands (2007–2015)

Oceania
 (unorganised, unincorporated territory of the United States)
Governor – Togiola Tulafono, Governor of American Samoa (2003–2013)

Monarch – Elizabeth II, Queen of Australia (1952–present)
Governor-General – Quentin Bryce, Governor-General of Australia (2008–2014)
Prime Minister –
Kevin Rudd, Prime Minister of Australia (2007–2010)
Julia Gillard, Prime Minister of Australia (2010–2013)
 (external territory of Australia)
Administrator – Brian Lacy, Administrator of Christmas Island (2009–2012)
Shire-President – Gordon Thomson, Shire president of Christmas Island (2003–2011)
 (external territory of Australia)
Administrator – Brian Lacy, Administrator of the Cocos (Keeling) Islands (2009–2012)
Shire-President – Balmut Pirus, Shire president of the Cocos (Keeling) Islands (2009–2011)
 (self-governing territory of Australia)
Administrator – Owen Walsh, Administrator of Norfolk Island (2007–2012)
Chief Minister –
Andre Nobbs, Chief Minister of Norfolk Island (2007–2010)
David Buffett, Chief Minister of Norfolk Island (2010–2013)

President – Ratu Epeli Nailatikau, President of Fiji (2009–2015)
Prime Minister – Frank Bainimarama, Prime Minister of Fiji (2007–present)
  (overseas collectivity of France)
High Commissioner – Adolphe Colrat, High Commissioner of the Republic in French Polynesia (2008–2011)
President – Gaston Tong Sang, President of French Polynesia (2009–2011)
 (insular area of the United States)
Governor – Felix Perez Camacho, Governor of Guam (2003–2011)

President – Anote Tong, President of Kiribati (2003–2016)

President – Jurelang Zedkaia, President of the Marshall Islands (2009–2012)

President – Manny Mori, President of Micronesia (2007–2015)

President – Marcus Stephen, President of Nauru (2007–2011)
  (sui generis collectivity of France)
High Commissioner –
Yves Dassonville, High Commissioner of New Caledonia (2007–2010)
Thierry Suquet, Acting High Commissioner of New Caledonia (2010)
Albert Dupuy, High Commissioner of New Caledonia (2010–2013)
Head of Government – Philippe Gomès, President of the Government of New Caledonia (2009–2011)

Monarch – Elizabeth II, Queen of New Zealand (1952–present)
Governor-General – Sir Anand Satyanand, Governor-General of New Zealand (2006–2011)
Prime Minister – John Key, Prime Minister of New Zealand (2008–2016)
 (associated state of New Zealand)
Queen's Representative – Sir Frederick Tutu Goodwin, Queen's Representative of the Cook Islands (2001–2013)
Prime Minister –
Jim Marurai, Prime Minister of the Cook Islands (2004–2010)
Henry Puna, Prime Minister of the Cook Islands (2010–2020)
 (associated state of New Zealand)
Premier – Toke Talagi, Premier of Niue (2008–present)
 (dependent territory of New Zealand)
Administrator – John Allen, Acting Administrator of Tokelau (2009–2011)
Head of Government –
Foua Toloa, Head of Government of Tokelau (2009–2010)
Kuresa Nasau, Head of Government of Tokelau (2010–2011)
 (Commonwealth of the United States)
Governor – Benigno Fitial, Governor of the Northern Mariana Islands (2006–2013)

President – Johnson Toribiong, President of Palau (2009–2013)

Monarch – Elizabeth II, Queen of Papua New Guinea (1975–present)
Governor-General –
Sir Paulias Matane, Governor-General of Papua New Guinea (2004–2010)
Jeffrey Nape, Acting Governor-General of Papua New Guinea (2010)
Michael Ogio, Acting Governor-General of Papua New Guinea (2010–2011)
Prime Minister –
Sir Michael Somare, Prime Minister of Papua New Guinea (2002–2010)
Sam Abal, Acting Prime Minister of Papua New Guinea (2010–2011)
 (Overseas Territory of the United Kingdom)
Governor –
George Fergusson, Governor of the Pitcairn Islands (2006–2010)
Mike Cherrett, Acting Governor of the Pitcairn Islands (2010)
Victoria Treadell, Governor of the Pitcairn Islands (2010–2014)
Mayor – Mike Warren, Mayor of the Pitcairn Islands (2008–2013)

Head of State – Tufuga Efi, O le Ao o le Malo of Samoa (2007–2017)
Prime Minister – Tuilaepa Aiono Sailele Malielegaoi, Prime Minister of Samoa (1998–2021)

Monarch – Elizabeth II, Queen of the Solomon Islands (1978–present)
Governor-General – Sir Frank Kabui, Governor-General of the Solomon Islands (2009–2019)
Prime Minister –
Derek Sikua, Prime Minister of the Solomon Islands (2007–2010)
Danny Philip, Prime Minister of the Solomon Islands (2010–2011)

Monarch – George Tupou V, King of Tonga (2006–2012)
Prime Minister –
Feleti Sevele, Prime Minister of Tonga (2006–2010)
Sialeʻataongo Tuʻivakanō, Prime Minister of Tonga (2010–2014)

Monarch – Elizabeth II, Queen of Tuvalu (1978–present)
Governor-General –
Sir Filoimea Telito, Governor-General of Tuvalu (2005–2010)
Iakoba Italeli, Governor-General of Tuvalu (2010–2019)
Prime Minister –
Apisai Ielemia, Prime Minister of Tuvalu (2006–2010)
Maatia Toafa, Prime Minister of Tuvalu (2010)
Willy Telavi, Prime Minister of Tuvalu (2010–2013)

President – Iolu Abil, President of Vanuatu (2009–2014)
Prime Minister –
Edward Natapei, Prime Minister of Vanuatu (2008–2010)
Sato Kilman, Prime Minister of Vanuatu (2010–2011)
  (overseas collectivity of France)
Administrator –
Philippe Paolantoni, Administrator Superior of Wallis and Futuna (2008–2010)
Michel Jeanjean, Administrator Superior of Wallis and Futuna (2010–2013)
Head of Government –
Victor Brial, President of the Territorial Assembly of Wallis and Futuna (2007–2010)
Siliako Lauhea, President of the Territorial Assembly of Wallis and Futuna (2010–2011)

South America

President – Cristina Fernández de Kirchner, President of Argentina (2007–2015)

President – Evo Morales, President of Bolivia (2006–2019)

President – Luiz Inácio Lula da Silva, President of Brazil (2003–2010)

President –
Michelle Bachelet, President of Chile (2006–2010)
Sebastián Piñera, President of Chile (2010–2014)

President –
Álvaro Uribe, President of Colombia (2002–2010)
Juan Manuel Santos, President of Colombia (2010–2018)

President – Rafael Correa, President of Ecuador (2007–2017)
 (Overseas Territory of the United Kingdom)
Governor –
Alan Huckle, Governor of the Falkland Islands (2006–2010)
Ric Nye, Acting Governor of the Falkland Islands (2010)
Nigel Haywood, Governor of the Falkland Islands (2010–2014)
Head of Government – Tim Thorogood, Chief Executive of the Falkland Islands (2008–2012)

President – Bharrat Jagdeo, President of Guyana (1999–2011)
Prime Minister – Sam Hinds, Prime Minister of Guyana (1999–2015)

President – Fernando Lugo, President of Paraguay (2008–2012)

President – Alan García, President of Peru (2006–2011)
Prime Minister –
Javier Velásquez, President of the Council of Ministers of Peru (2009–2010)
José Antonio Chang, President of the Council of Ministers of Peru (2010–2011)

President –
Ronald Venetiaan, President of Suriname (2000–2010)
Dési Bouterse, President of Suriname (2010–2020)

President –
Tabaré Vázquez, President of Uruguay (2005–2010)
José Mujica, President of Uruguay (2010–2015)

President – Hugo Chávez, President of Venezuela (2002–2013)

Notes

External links
Rulersa list of rulers throughout time and places
WorldStatesmenan online encyclopedia of the leaders of nations and territories

State leaders
State leaders
State leaders
2010